Todd Bosley (born July 29, 1984) is an American actor. Bosley lives in Los Angeles, California.

He is best known for playing the role of Howie in the sitcom Scrubs. He began his acting career as a child, having notable roles in Treehouse Hostage, Little Giants and Jack. As a child actor on television he played a kid, and friend, to Cosmo Kramer in two episodes of the sitcom Seinfeld ("The Wait Out" and "The Foundation"). Bosley played the title role in the 2001 family film Lloyd. He was seen in the episode "Blankie Go Bye-Bye" of Good Luck Charlie and "iFind Spencer Friends" on iCarly. He also played the role of the nerd in “Campaign in the Neck” season 1 episode 7 of That's So Raven, and the role of Duane in "The Skull in the Sculpture", season 4, episode 8 of Bones. He is a cousin of Happy Days star Tom Bosley.

External links

1984 births
Living people
Male actors from Kansas
American male child actors
American male film actors
American male television actors
People from Overland Park, Kansas